Maja e Moravës, a mountain peak on the border between Albania and North Macedonia reaches a height of  above mean sea level. Maja e Moravës is on the southern section of Mount Korab and is more easily ascended on the Albanian side as the Macedonian side being the east side, is very rocky.

References

Mountains of Albania